Shag Island may refer to:

Shag Island (South Australia), South Australia
 Shag Reef, Tasmania, Australia
 Tarahiki Island, also known as Shag Island, Hauraki Gulf, New Zealand
Shag Islands,  Newfoundland, Canada
 Shag Islet, a small island 10 km north of Heard Island.

See also
 Shag Rock (disambiguation)
 Shag Rocks (disambiguation)
 Shag Reef